Catalogue / Preserve / Amass is a live album released in 2012 by British musician and record producer Steven Wilson, known for being the founder and frontman of psychedelic/progressive rock band Porcupine Tree.

Track listing

Original releases: Tracks #1 and 6  from album Insurgentes; tracks #2, 3, 4, 5 and 7 from Grace for Drowning.

Limited Vinyl Edition 
On April 21, 2012, a limited vinyl edition was released as part of Record Store Day.  This edition is limited to 2,000 copies, and has a condensed track list:

Side A 
 Index
 Deform to Form a Star
 No Part of Me

Side B
 Raider II

Personnel
 Steven Wilson : vocals, guitars, keyboards
 Aziz Ibrahim : guitars
 Nick Beggs : bass guitar, Chapman stick, backing vocals
 Adam Holzman : keyboards, piano
 Theo Travis : flute, saxophone
 Marco Minnemann : drums

2012 live albums
Steven Wilson albums